Jørgen Gry (19 May 1915 – 18 July 1993) was a Danish field hockey player who competed in the 1936 Summer Olympics.

He was born in Copenhagen and died in Egebæksvang, Helsingør.

In 1936 he was a squad member of the Danish team which was eliminated in the group stage of the Olympic tournament. He played one match in the consolation round.

External links
 
profile

1915 births
1993 deaths
Danish male field hockey players
Olympic field hockey players of Denmark
Field hockey players at the 1936 Summer Olympics
Sportspeople from Copenhagen